Bryce Mefford (born October 3, 1998, in Folsom, California) is an American swimmer and 2020 US Olympic Team member.  He swam for Oak Ridge High School in El Dorado Hills, California. He currently competes at the collegiate level for the University of California.

He placed second in the 200m Backstroke final of the US Olympic Team Trials in Omaha, qualifying him for the 2020 Olympic Games.
He placed fourth in the 200m Backstroke Olympic final at Tokyo 2020.

Mefford represented the United States at the 2019 World University Games.

References

Living people
American male backstroke swimmers
1998 births
People from Folsom, California
People from El Dorado Hills, California
Sportspeople from Sacramento County, California
Swimmers at the 2020 Summer Olympics
Olympic swimmers of the United States
California Golden Bears men's swimmers
20th-century American people
21st-century American people